Operation Jupiter  may refer to:

 from 1941 to 1944, Operation Jupiter (Norway) was a British plan for an invasion of northern Norway
 in 1942, according to David Glantz, Operation Jupiter was a canceled Soviet plan for an attack towards Vyazma, as a part of failed Operation Mars
 in 1944, Operation Jupiter (1944) was an attack launched by the Second British Army
 in 1945, Operation Jupiter was the liberation of the Île d'Oléron by Free French Forces
 Operation Jupiter was the French title of the 1988 video game Hostages
 Operation Jupiter was the West German title for the 1984 Japanese science-fiction film Sayonara Jupiter